GMR Marketing is an engagement marketing advertising agency, which is headquartered in New Berlin, Wisconsin. 

The firm was founded in 1979 by Gary M. Reynolds, who was credited with originating the practice of engagement marketing.  Reynolds stepped down as CEO in 2014 but remains chairman of GMR Marketing. The firm has been a subsidiary of the Omnicom Group since 1997.

GMR Marketing's Global Headquarters in New Berlin, WI was listed by The Milwaukee Journal Sentinel as one of the "Best Places to Work" for the years 2015, 2016, and 2017. Listing features such as a "Barcade", outdoor patios with fire pits, indoor cafés, and a recording studio as some of the amenities available to the office employees and clients.

References

External links

Companies based in Wisconsin
Marketing companies established in 1979
Marketing companies of the United States